Dichrorampha sedatana is a moth of the family Tortricidae.

Description

The wingspan of Dichrorampha sedatana reaches 12–16 mm. These moths fly from April to June. There is one generation per year.

The larvae mainly feed on several Asteraceae roots, especially Tanacetum vulgare, but also on other Tanacetum species and Leucanthemum.

Distribution
This species is widespread in Europe.

Habitat
Dichrorampha sedatana prefers rough meadows and waysides.

External links
 Lepidoptera of Belgium
 Swedish moths
 Lepiforum
 Hantsmoths
 Norfolk Moths

Grapholitini
Moths of Europe